Sir Christopher Dudley Roger Rose (born 10 February 1937) is a former judge of the Court of Appeal of England and Wales and a member of the Privy Council of the United Kingdom.

Education
Christopher Rose was educated at Morecambe Grammar School (1947—1950), a former state grammar school, in the seaside town of Morecambe, in Lancashire, and Repton School (1950—1954), a boarding independent school for boys, in the village of Repton, in Derbyshire, followed by the University of Leeds (1954—1957), from which he obtained a degree in Law and Wadham College at the University of Oxford,
from which he graduated as Bachelor of Civil Law (BCL), in 1959. He has acted as an Honorary Fellow at Wadham College since 1993.

Life and career
Rose became Vice-President of the Criminal Division of the Court of Appeal in 1997. In 2002 he was Treasurer of Middle Temple Inn. On 24 April 2006 he retired, and soon afterwards he was appointed Chief Surveillance Commissioner, a post which he held until 2015.

During his time on the Court of Appeal he was an outspoken critic of recent legislation, in particular the Criminal Justice Act 2003 and the Sexual Offences Act 2003, which he criticised as being poorly drafted, saying: "If a history of criminal legislation ever comes to be written it is unlikely that 2003 will be identified as a year of exemplary skill in the annals of Parliamentary drafting."

In 2009 he said the Civil Nuclear Constabulary's "approach to covert activity is conspicuously professional'. He found that the system for storing the intelligence gained from informers was 'working well' and that "senior officers regard covert surveillance as a long-term requirement".

References

20th-century English judges
Lords Justices of Appeal
1937 births
Living people
Alumni of the University of Leeds
Alumni of Wadham College, Oxford
Knights Bachelor
Members of the Privy Council of the United Kingdom
People educated at Repton School
21st-century English judges